is a railway station in Settsu, Osaka Prefecture, Japan.

Lines
West Japan Railway Company
JR Kyoto Line (Tōkaidō Main Line)

History
The station opened on 1 December 1938.

Station numbering was introduced to the station in March 2018 with Senrioka being assigned station number JR-A42.

Layout
The station has two island platforms, each of which exclusively serves up or down trains. The outer side of each platform is fenced as all trains on the outer tracks pass through this station without stopping.

References

Railway stations in Japan opened in 1938
Railway stations in Osaka Prefecture
Settsu, Osaka
Tōkaidō Main Line